Boris Nikitich Popov (born 21 March 1941) is a Russian water polo player who competed for the Soviet Union in the 1964 Summer Olympics.

Career 
In 1964 he was a member of the Soviet team which won the bronze medal in the Olympic water polo tournament. He played all six matches.

Popov is one of the most successful water polo coach in Olympic history. He led Soviet Union men's national team to win an Olympic gold medal in 1980 and a bronze medal in 1988. Four years later, he coached the Unified Team to win another bronze medal. In 4th FINA World Championships 1982 in Guayaquil, he won the gold medal in the respective water polo championship as coach of Soviet Union men's national team.
He is one of a few sportspeople who won Olympic medals in water polo as players and head coaches.

See also 
 Soviet Union men's Olympic water polo team records and statistics
 List of Olympic champions in men's water polo
 List of Olympic medalists in water polo (men)
 List of world champions in men's water polo
 List of members of the International Swimming Hall of Fame

References

External links
 

1941 births
Living people
Russian male water polo players
Soviet male water polo players
Olympic water polo players of the Soviet Union
Water polo players at the 1964 Summer Olympics
Medalists at the 1964 Summer Olympics
Olympic bronze medalists for the Soviet Union
Olympic medalists in water polo
Soviet water polo coaches
Russian water polo coaches
Soviet Union men's national water polo team coaches
Water polo coaches at the 1980 Summer Olympics
Water polo coaches at the 1988 Summer Olympics
Water polo coaches at the 1992 Summer Olympics
Olympiacos Water Polo Club coaches